Hamit Akbay (born 1900, date of death unknown) was a Turkish footballer. He played in six matches for the Turkey national football team in 1924 and 1925.

References

External links
 

1900 births
Year of death missing
Turkish footballers
Turkey international footballers
Place of birth missing
Association football goalkeepers
Fenerbahçe S.K. footballers
Olympic footballers of Turkey
Footballers at the 1924 Summer Olympics